The women's pentathlon competition of the athletics events at the 1979 Pan American Games took place at the Estadio Sixto Escobar. It was the first edition where the 800 metres was contested instead of the 200 metres as part of the pentathlon. It was actually also pentathlon's last appearance at the Games being replaced by the heptathlon from the next edition.

Records
Prior to this competition, the existing world and Pan American Games records were as follows:

Results

References

Athletics at the 1979 Pan American Games
1979